J. G. Claassen (born 28 February 1991) is a South African professional golfer.

Claassen plays on the Sunshine Tour where he has one win, the 2011 MTC Namibia PGA Championship.

Professional wins (1)

Sunshine Tour wins (1)

Team appearances
Amateur
Eisenhower Trophy (representing South Africa): 2010

References

External links

South African male golfers
Sunshine Tour golfers
People from Klerksdorp
1991 births
Living people